The Bundesstraße 320 is a German federal highway. The original path of this federal highway, enacted in 1938, led from Prenzlau in an easterly direction to the newly built Bundesautobahn 11. During East German reign, this road was downgraded; the number 320 was instead assigned to a new road, leading from Lübben past Straupitz and Lieberose to Guben near the Polish border. In 2004, the path was changed so it doesn't start at Lübben, but rather further to the north near the village of Groß Leine where it seamlessly connects to the Bundesstraße 179 coming from Königs Wusterhausen.

320